Arthur Alexander (May 10, 1940 – June 9, 1993) was an American country-soul songwriter and singer. Jason Ankeny, music critic for AllMusic, said Alexander was a "country-soul pioneer" and that, though largely unknown, "his music is the stuff of genius, a poignant and deeply intimate body of work on par with the best of his contemporaries." Alexander's songs were covered by such stars as the Beatles, the Rolling Stones, Bob Dylan, Gerry and the Pacemakers, Otis Redding, Tina Turner, Pearl Jam, and Jerry Lee Lewis.

Life
Alexander was born in Sheffield, Alabama, United States. Working with Spar Music in Florence, Alabama, Alexander recorded his first single, "Sally Sue Brown", under the name of June Alexander (short for Junior), which was released in 1960 on Jud Phillips' Judd Records. (Phillips is the brother of music pioneer Sam Phillips).

A year later, Alexander cut "You Better Move On", at the fledgling FAME Studios, which at that point was located above the City Drug Store in Florence, Alabama. (The studio would shortly move to its more famous location in nearby Muscle Shoals, Alabama.) Released on Nashville's Dot Records, the song became a soul/R&B chart hit, and laid the foundation for the modern recording studio FAME. "You Better Move On" is perhaps Alexander's best-known song, covered by the Rolling Stones, the Hollies, George Jones & Johnny Paycheck, Gene Clark (from the Byrds) and Mink DeVille. "Anna (Go to Him)", a U.S. R&B Top Ten Hit, was covered by the Beatles, Roger McGuinn (from The Byrds) and Humble Pie. The Beatles did live recordings of "Soldier of Love" (also performed by Marshall Crenshaw and Pearl Jam), "A Shot of Rhythm and Blues", and "Where Have You Been" at the Star-Club in Hamburg in 1962.

In 1962, Steve Alaimo was the first to record Alexander's "Every Day I Have to Cry", which reached No.46 on the U.S. Billboard Hot 100 chart. Dusty Springfield also recorded the song for her first UK solo EP, "I Only Want to Be With You", released in 1964.

In the mid-1960s, Alexander switched to another label, Sound Stage 7, but failed to find commercial success. Although a 1972 album for Warner Brothers was promising, the singer's potential seemed to wither. He secured a pop hit with "Every Day I Have to Cry Some" on Buddah Records in 1975, but the success remained short-lived. The song was also covered by Ike and Tina Turner (produced by Phil Spector), the McCoys, Dusty Springfield, Joe Stampley, C.J. Chenier, Jerry Lee Lewis, the Gentrys and others. The follow-up single "Sharing The Night Together" (written by Muscle Shoals songwriters Ava Aldridge and Eddie Struzick) reached No. 92 on the R&B charts, but earned Dr. Hook & the Medicine Show a Top 10 hit in 1978; the Dr. Hook version was used in the 2012 Family Guy episode "Mr. and Mrs. Stewie".

For many years, Alexander was out of the music business; he was a bus driver for much of this time. In 1990, he was inducted into the Alabama Music Hall of Fame. He began to perform again in 1993 as renewed interest was shown in his back catalogue. His last album Lonely Just Like Me was his first in 21 years.

He signed a new recording/publishing contract in May 1993 but suffered a fatal heart attack on 9 June 1993 in Nashville, three days after performing there with his new band. He is buried in Florence City Cemetery in Florence, Alabama.

Legacy
Alexander is the only songwriter whose songs have been covered on studio albums by the Beatles, the Rolling Stones and Bob Dylan (who recorded "Sally Sue Brown" on his 1988 LP Down in the Groove). In 1987, Paul McCartney claimed that "If the Beatles wanted a sound, it was R&B. That's what we used to listen to and what we wanted to be like. Black, that was basically it. Arthur Alexander."

Discography
(USA issues except where noted)

Singles

EPs
 Arthur Alexander, Dot 655 (Sweden) (1962) 
 Alexander The Great!, London 1364 (UK) (1963) 
 Arthur Alexander, London 1401 (UK) (1963) 
 A Shot of Rhythm and Blues, El Toro 15.086 (Spain) (2017)

Studio albums
 You Better Move On, Dot & London (UK) (1962)
 Arthur Alexander, Warner Brothers (1972)
 Lonely Just Like Me, Nonesuch/Elektra (1993)

Album reissues
 Story Of Rock 'N' Roll (LP, 1977) Ariola (Germany) (Reissue of You Better Move On)
 Arthur Alexander (LP, 1989) Ace (UK)
 You Better Move On (CD, 1993) MCA (UK) (Reissue of LP with 8 bonus tracks)
 You Better Move On (CD, 2014) Hoodoo Records (EU) (Reissue of LP with 14 bonus tracks)
 Rainbow Road: The Warner Bros. Recordings (CD, 1994) Warner Archives (Reissue of self-titled Warner LP above with bonus tracks)
 Lonely Just Like Me: The Final Chapter (CD, 2007) Hacktone (Reissue of CD with bonus tracks)
 Arthur Alexander: Expanded Edition (CD, 2017) Omnivore

Compilation albums
 Various Artists – Greatest Rhythm And Blues Stars (1965) Guest Star (two tracks by Alexander)
 Carl Perkins – Sing A Song With Me (1979) Koala (four demos by Alexander)
 A Shot Of Rhythm And Soul (1982) Ace (UK)
 Soldier Of Love (1987) Ace (UK)
 The Greatest (1989 & 2006) Ace (UK)
 The Ultimate Arthur Alexander (1993) Razor & Tie
 Jon Tiven's Ego Trip – Blue Guru (1996) Fountainbleu (one over-dubbed demo by Alexander)
 Various Artists – Bill Haney's Atlanta Soul Brotherhood (1998) Kent (UK) (one track by Alexander)
 Various Artists – Bill Haney's Atlanta Soul Brotherhood Vol 2 (1998) Kent (UK) (one track by Alexander)
 The Monument Years (2001) Ace (UK)

Tribute albums
 Various Artists: Adios Amigo: A Tribute To Arthur Alexander (1994) Razor And Tie (17 tracks by artists including Elvis Costello, Roger McGuinn; Graham Parker; John Prine; Nick Lowe; Marshall Crenshaw and Zucchero.) 
 Donnie Fritts: June – A Tribute To Arthur Alexander (2018)

Discography notes

Songs written by Alexander
 "Sally Sue Brown" (co-writer), recorded 1960, covered by Bob Dylan, Elvis Costello
 "You Better Move On", recorded 1961, covered by the Hollies, the Rolling Stones, Tommy Roe, George Jones & Johnny Paycheck, Billy "Crash" Craddock, Mink DeVille
 "Anna (Go To Him)", recorded 1962, covered by the Beatles, Roger McGuinn, Humble Pie
 "Every Day I Have to Cry Some", written 1962, recorded 1975, produced by Phil Spector, covered by Ike and Tina Turner, Bee Gees, Johnny Rivers, Debby Boone
 "Go Home Girl", recorded 1962, covered by the Rolling Stones, Ry Cooder, Gary U.S. Bonds, Frank Black
 "In the Middle of it All", recorded 1987

See also
Muscle Shoals Sound Studio
Soul music
Country music

References

Bibliography
 Richard Younger; Get a Shot of Rhythm and Blues: The Arthur Alexander Story The University of Alabama Press (2000)

External links
 
 
 Arthur Alexander, Secondhandsongs.com
 Comprehensive Arthur Alexander Discography
 Alabama Music Hall of Fame
 Interview With Richard Younger, "Get A Shot Of Rhythm And Blues: The Arthur Alexander Story"
 "Arthur Alexander" by Richard Younger
 "The Country Soul of Arthur Alexander" by Tim Quine

1940 births
1993 deaths
People from Sheffield, Alabama
American country singer-songwriters
American soul musicians
African-American male singer-songwriters
Dot Records artists
Monument Records artists
African-American country musicians
Omnivore Recordings artists
Country musicians from Alabama
Country musicians from Tennessee
20th-century African-American male singers
Singer-songwriters from Alabama
Singer-songwriters from Tennessee